In Javanese wayang (shadow puppets),  the panakawan or panakavan (phanakavhan) are the clown servants of the hero. There are four of them – Semar (also known as Ki Lurah Semar), Petruk, Gareng and Bagong. Semar is the personification of a deity, sometimes said to be the dhanyang or guardian spirit of the island of Java. In Javanese mythology, deities can only manifest themselves as ugly or otherwise unprepossessing humans, and so Semar is always portrayed as short and fat with a pug nose and a dangling hernia.

His three companions are his adopted sons, given to Semar as votaries by their parents. Petruk is portrayed as tall and gangling with a long nose, Gareng as short with a club foot and Bagong as obese.

The panakawan always appear in the second act of a wayang performance – pathet sanga – as servants to the hero of the story regardless of who that hero is.

Similar characters appear in other Indonesian wayang and theatrical traditions, including those of Bali and Sunda, under different names.

The panakawan characters are generally much-loved by audiences who attend wayang plays in Indonesia and their appearance in the plays is usually greeted with laughter and anticipation.

Role

The term panakawan comes from the word pana which means "understand", and kawan which means "friend". The point is that the panakawans are not just mere servants or followers, but they also understand what is happening to their masters. In fact, they often act as advisors to their masters.

The most distinctive thing about the existence of panakawan is they act as a group that spreads humour in the story. Their behavior and speech typically invite laughter from the audience. Apart from being comforters and advisers, they sometimes also act as helpers to their masters in times of adversity. For example, when Bimasena has to face Shakuni in the Baratayuda war, Semar comes up to inform him of Shakuni's weakness.

In conversations between panakawans, it is common for the language and terms they use to be modern terms that are not in accordance with their era. But this seems to have become a normal thing and is not a problem. For example, in wayang performances, the Petruk character claims to have a car or cellphone, even though these two objects certainly did not exist in the wayang era back then.

References

Further reading
 Brandon, James (1970). On thrones of gold - three Javanese shadow plays. Harvard University Press.
 Keeler, Ward (1987). Javanese Shadow Plays, Javanese Selves. Princeton University Press.
 Keeler, Ward (1992). Javanese Shadow Puppets. OUP.
 Long, Roger (1982). Javanese shadow theatre: Movement and characterization in Ngayogyakarta wayang kulit. Umi Research Press.

External links
 Indonesian site in English about Semar and the Punokawan
 Do You Know Your Kurawas From Your Pandawas: Wayang's Origins Stories: Jakarta Globe
Wayang

Javanese mythology
Indonesian mythology